The following is a list of churches and cathedrals in the Armenian capital city of Yerevan along with their architectural styles.

Active churches

Armenian Apostolic

Russian Orthodox church buildings

Partly-ruined churches

Armenian Apostolic

Entirely demolished churches

Armenian Apostolic

Russian Orthodox

Under construction

Armenian Apostolic

References

Yerevan
Churches